Talparia talpa, common name the mole cowry or chocolate banded cowry, is a species of sea snail, a cowry, a marine gastropod mollusk in the family Cypraeidae, the cowries.

Subspecies
 Talparia talpa lutani Bridges, 2015
 Talparia talpa talpa (Linnaeus, 1758)
Synonyms
  Talparia talpa imperialis Schilder, F.A. & M. Schilder, 1938: synonym of Talparia talpa (Linnaeus, 1758)
 Talparia talpa var. lewallorum Lorenz, 2015: synonym of Talparia talpa (Linnaeus, 1758) (unavailable name: infrasubspecific rank)
 Talparia talpa saturata (Dautzenberg, Ph., 1903): synonym of Talparia talpa (Linnaeus, 1758)

Description
They are very variable in pattern and colour. The dorsum surface is smooth and shiny, the basic color is brown or yellowish brown, with three or four yellow or light brown transversal bands. The margins, the base and the teeth are completely dark brown or black. Also the teeth are dark brown, but the teeth spacing is clearer or white. In the living cowries the mantle is greyish or black, with long cylindrical papillae. Mantle and foot are well developed, with external antennae. The lateral flaps of the mantle may hide completely the shell surface and may be quickly retracted into the shell.

Distribution
This species occurs in the Red Sea and in the Indian Ocean  along East Africa  (Aldabra, Chagos, the Comores, Eritrea, Kenya, Madagascar, the Mascarene Basin, Mauritius, Mozambique, Réunion, the Seychelles, Somalia and Tanzania), in the western Pacific (western Australia, Philippines), in Polynesia and Hawaii.

Habitat
These cowries live on coral reef or in shallow lagoons in tropical intertidal and subtidal waters up to 30 m depth. They can be found under ledges and in small coral caves at night, as they start feeding at dusk.

References

 Verdcourt, B. (1954). The cowries of the East African Coast (Kenya, Tanganyika, Zanzibar and Pemba). Journal of the East Africa Natural History Society 22(4) 96: 129-144, 17 pls.
 Burgess, C.M. (1970). The Living Cowries. AS Barnes and Co, Ltd. Cranbury, New Jersey
 Lorenz F. (2015). A dwarf variation of Talparia talpa. Beautifulcowries Magazine. 7: 31-32
 Liu, J.Y. [Ruiyu] (ed.). (2008). Checklist of marine biota of China seas. China Science Press. 1267 pp.
 Steyn, D. G.; Lussi, M. (2005). Offshore Shells of Southern Africa: A pictorial guide to more than 750 Gastropods. Published by the authors. pp. i–vi, 1–289.

External links
 Biolib
 Gastropods.com : Talpa talpa : photos; accessed : 23 October 2010
 Talparia talpa
 Linnaeus, C. (1758). Systema Naturae per regna tria naturae, secundum classes, ordines, genera, species, cum characteribus, differentiis, synonymis, locis. Editio decima, reformata

Cypraeidae
Gastropods described in 1758
Taxa named by Carl Linnaeus